State Route 768 (SR 768) is a  long north–south state highway in the central portion of the U.S. state of Ohio.

Created in the middle of the 1940s, SR 768 is a two-lane route that serves as a connector route between US 36 and SR 3 in the northeastern portion of the Mount Vernon vicinity.  For its entire length, State Route 768 is alternately known as Vernonview Drive.

Route description
The entirety of SR 768 is located within the central part of Knox County. SR 768 is not a part of the National Highway System.

The highway commences at a signalized intersection with US 36 in the eastern end of Mount Vernon. Traveling north from there, while in within the city limits of Mount Vernon the highway passes through a primarily residential area, intersecting a few side streets along the way.  As SR 768 exits the city and enters Monroe Township, it abuts the eastern side of Hiawatha Golf Course. Meanwhile, on the east side of the road there is a blend of woods and fields, with a couple of homes appearing amidst the blended landscape. Upon crossing the Avalon Road (County Road 72) intersection, SR 768 passes by the Mount Vernon Development Center, which appears on the east side of the highway. The remainder of the highway passes amidst a blend of forest, open field and houses prior to arriving at its endpoint at SR 3.

History
SR 768 was designated in 1946. It has always been routed along the US 36–SR 3 alignment as it follows today and has not experienced any major changes since it was established.

Major intersections

References

768
Transportation in Knox County, Ohio